Poduri is a commune in Bacău County, Western Moldavia, Romania. It is composed of seven villages: Bucșești, Cernu, Cornet, Negreni, Poduri, Prohozești and Valea Șoșii.

The Poduri archeological site of the late Neolithic Cucuteni-Trypillian culture is significant due to its thirteen habitation levels that were constructed on top of each other over many years.

Geography 
Poduri sits in the central-western part of the county, on the right bank of Tazlăul Sărat river. It lies around 4 km (2.5 miles) southeast of its nearest town Moinești. It is crossed by county road DJ117, which links west of Moinești (where it ends in DN2G) and south of Berzunți and Livezi (where it ends in DN11).

Natives
Eugen Chirnoagă
Platon Chirnoagă
Petre Grigoraș

References

Communes in Bacău County
Localities in Western Moldavia
Cucuteni–Trypillia culture